Absheron is an Azerbaijani women's volleyball club based in Baku that competes in the Azerbaijan Superleague.

History
Absheron women's volleyball club was established in 2017 and joined the Azerbaijan Superleague in the same year. The club took the second place in the 2017–18 season and third place in the 2018–19 season. In the 2021–22 season, Absheron won all of its games in the first 9 rounds and won the Superleague for the first time in its history, 3 rounds before the end of the league.

Honours
  Azerbaijan Superleague:
  Winners (1): 2021-22
  Runners-up (1): 2017-18
  Third (1): 2018-19

References

External links
Official website
Volleybox profile

Azerbaijani volleyball clubs
Volleyball clubs established in 2017
2000 establishments in Azerbaijan
Sports teams in Baku